"Show Some Respect" is a song recorded by recording artist Tina Turner. It was written by Terry Britten and Sue Shifrin and released as the sixth single from her fifth solo album Private Dancer (1984). While not released as a single in Europe, it found Top 40 success in the US and nearly made the Top 40 in Canada, peaking at number 42. The B-side to "Show Some Respect" is a live cover of Prince's song "Let's Pretend We're Married".

Personnel 
Tina Turner – lead vocals
Terry Britten – guitar, background vocals
Nick Glennie-Smith, Billy Livsey  – keyboards 
Tessa Niles – background vocals
Graham Jarvis – drums

Versions and remixes
 Album version - 3:18
 Extended 12" Remix - 5:47

Charts

References

1984 singles
Tina Turner songs
Songs written by Terry Britten
1984 songs
Capitol Records singles